Phosum Khimhun is an Indian politician from the state of Arunachal Pradesh.

Khimhun was elected from 52-Changlang south seat in the 2014 Arunachal Pradesh Legislative Assembly election, standing as a People's Party of Arunachal candidate.

He is married to Dr. Mrs. M. Khimhun and has 2 children.

See also
Arunachal Pradesh Legislative Assembly

References

External links
Phosum Khimhun profile
MyNeta Profile
Janpratinidhi Profile

People's Party of Arunachal politicians
Indian National Congress politicians
Living people
Arunachal Pradesh MLAs 2019–2024
Arunachal Pradesh MLAs 2014–2019
Year of birth missing (living people)